James Troesh, also known as Jim Troesh (1956–2011) was an actor, screenwriter and entertainment industry disability advocate.

He was paralyzed when at the age of 14 following an accident in the family home, which rendered him quadriplegic for the remainder of his life, making him one of very few quadriplegic actors to be successful in the entertainment industry and the first quadriplegic actor to ever join the Screen Actors Guild.

He was a writer and actor for the TV series Highway to Heaven (1984–89). Other TV appearances include Airwolf, Boston Legal, and the TV movie Rise and Walk: The Dennis Byrd Story.

References

External links

1956 births
2011 deaths
Actors with disabilities
American male television actors
American male television writers
People with tetraplegia
Wheelchair users
Writers with disabilities